Macutula is a spider genus of the jumping spider family, Salticidae, from Brazil. It comprises medium-sized jumping spiders (4–7 mm) with slightly flattened bodies and dark brown carapaces. It is distinguished from other genera in the Amycoida clade by the deep prolateral excavation on the dorsal surface of the cymbium of the male pedipalp, forming a dorsal keel.

Species
 Macutula aracoiaba Ruiz, 2011 (Brazil)
 Macutula caruaru Ruiz, 2011 (Brazil)
 Macutula santana Ruiz, 2011 (Brazil)

References

Salticidae
Spiders of Brazil
Salticidae genera